The first season of Prison Break, an American serial drama television series, commenced airing in the United States and Canada on August 29, 2005, on Mondays at 9:00 p.m. (EST) on Fox. Prison Break is produced by Adelstein-Parouse Productions, in association with Rat Entertainment, Original Film and 20th Century Fox Television. The season contains 22 episodes, and concluded on May 15, 2006. In addition to the 22 regular episodes, a special, "Behind the Walls", was aired on October 11, 2005.

Prison Break revolves around two brothers: Lincoln Burrows, who has been sentenced to death for a crime he did not commit and his younger brother Michael Scofield, a genius who devises an elaborate plan to help him escape prison by purposely getting himself imprisoned. 

A total of ten actors received  star billing in the first season, with numerous supporting roles. Filming took place mostly in and around the Chicago area; Fox River was represented by Joliet Prison, which had closed in 2002. Critical reviews of the first season were generally favorable. The first season was released on DVD in Region One as a six-disc boxed set under the title of Prison Break: Season One on August 8, 2006.

Cast

Main characters
 Dominic Purcell as Lincoln Burrows
 Wentworth Miller as Michael Scofield
 Robin Tunney as Veronica Donovan
 Peter Stormare as John Abruzzi
 Amaury Nolasco as Fernando Sucre
 Marshall Allman as L.J. Burrows
 Wade Williams as Captain Brad Bellick
 Paul Adelstein as Secret Service Agent Paul Kellerman
 Robert Knepper as Theodore "T-Bag" Bagwell
 Rockmond Dunbar as Benjamin Miles "C-Note" Franklin
 Sarah Wayne Callies as Dr. Sara Tancredi

Recurring characters

Episodes

Production

Crew
The season was produced by Adelstein-Parouse Productions, in association with Original Television and 20th Century Fox Television. The executive producers were creator Paul Scheuring, Marty Adelstein, Neal H. Moritz, Dawn Parouse, Brett Ratner and Matt Olmstead. The staff writers were Scheuring, co-executive producers Nick Santora and Zack Estrin, supervising producer Karyn Usher and Olmstead. The regular director throughout the season was Bobby Roth; additional directors were Jace Alexander, Matt Earl Beesley and  Dwight H. Little. Its incidental music was composed by Ramin Djawadi.

Filming
Most of the first season of the series was filmed on location in and around Chicago. After it was closed down in 2002, Joliet Prison became the set of Prison Break in 2005, standing in as Fox River State Penitentiary on screen. Scenes set in Lincoln's cell, the infirmary and the prison yard were all shot on location at the prison. Lincoln's cell is the same one in which John Wayne Gacy was incarcerated. Most of the production crew refused to enter the cell, thinking that it was haunted. Other sets were built at the prison, including the cell blocks that housed the general prison population; these blocks had three tiers of cells (as opposed to the real cell block's two) and had cells much larger than real cells to allow more space for the actors and cameras. Exterior scenes were filmed in areas around Chicago, Woodstock, and Joliet in Illinois. Other locations included O'Hare International Airport in Chicago and Toronto, Ontario in Canada. Prison Break spent $2 million per episode in the state of Illinois, which cost them a total of $24 million in 2005.

Release

Critical reception
The season has a 77% "Certified Fresh" rating on review aggregator website Rotten Tomatoes, with the consensus stating: "Prison Break is confident pulp with a crackerjack premise that spreads thinly enough to smooth over the show's more lunkheaded flourishes." Metacritic gave the season a Metascore—a weighted average based on the impressions of a select 32 critical reviews—of 65, signifying generally favorable reviews. Based on its strong opening, The New York Times dubbed Prison Break "more intriguing than most of the new network series, and ... one of the most original" and a "suspenseful thriller", complimenting its "authentic look". Entertainment Weekly called it an "original drama", noting the show's "edge-of-the-seat action". On the other hand, however, The Washington Post criticized the show for its "somber pretentiousness" and "uniformly overwrought [performances]".

Ratings
The two-hour pilot episode garnered approximately 10.5 million viewers, giving Fox its "best summertime Monday numbers since episodes of Melrose Place and Ally McBeal aired there in September 1998." The show's first season attracted an average audience of 10 million viewers each week, with "End of the Tunnel" reaching 12 million viewers, and led the debuts of television in the 2005 American fall season. Prison Break was originally planned for a 13-episode run, but was extended to include an extra nine episodes due to its popularity.

Home media release

References

External links
 

2005 American television seasons
2006 American television seasons
Prison Break episodes
Prison Break